Parapropalaehoplophorus septentrionalis was a comparatively small (compared to Glyptodon) species of glyptodont, extinct relatives of the modern armadillo. The mammal, identified in 2007 from the fossilized remains of a specimen found in 2004, weighed approximately 200 pounds and had a shell covered by tiny circular bumps. It lumbered around northern Chile in the Chucal Formation, an area now dominated by the Andes mountain range, some 18 million years ago. Fossils of the glyptodont also have been found in Peru (Ipururo and Pebas Formations).

Etymology 
The name of the genus is the result of a chain of derivations from other genera.  The name means "near Propalaehoplophorus," which refers to the phylogenetic position of this animal and the fact that these two genera lived in what is now Chile during the same time period (though their fossils have not been found within the same formation). This name is itself derived from    Palaehoplophorus, which in turn is derived from Hoplophorus.  In each case, a newly discovered fossil animal was named after a previously known one with similar traits.

References

External links 
 Artist's reconstruction of P. septentrionalis at LiveScience.com

Prehistoric placental genera
Prehistoric cingulates
Miocene xenarthrans
Miocene mammals of South America
Laventan
Colloncuran
Friasian
Santacrucian
Neogene Chile
Fossils of Chile
Neogene Peru
Fossils of Peru
Fossil taxa described in 2007